Genge is a type of Nigerian music.

Genge may also refer to:
 Genge (surname)
 6626 Mattgenge, an asteroid named after English astronomer Dr. Matthew Genge
 Genge, Democratic Republic of Congo, town in Katanga Province, Democratic Republic of Congo